Serabostan (also Romanized as Serābostān) is a village in Gasht Rural District, in the Central District of Fuman County, Gilan Province, Iran. At the 2006 census, its population was 648, in 167 families.

References 

Populated places in Fuman County